Çukurbostan is a quarter of the European side of Istanbul located in the north side of the Fatih district (the walled city). Although it is difficult to define exactly its boundary, Çukurbostan lies between the neighbourhoods of Balat and Atikali. In the quarter are located the Yavuz Selim Mosque and the Byzantine Cistern of Aspar. The cistern was used in the Ottoman period as a vegetable garden, and its name Çukurbostan ("sunken garden") gave the name to the quarter.

Quarters of Fatih